The 2015 Dwars door de Westhoek was held on 26 April 2015, in Boezinge, Belgium. Élise Delzenne won, beating Jolien D'Hoore and Tiffany Cromwell.

Results

References

Dwars door de Westhoek
Dwars door de Westhoek